José Gabriel Severino (born 1 April 1974), better known by his stage name El Jeffrey, is a merengue artist from the Dominican Republic. A major album of his is "Mi Vida". El Jeffrey first became a household name with the 80's merengue group La Artillería.

Musical career 
With about 35 years of musical career, he is one of the most transcendent merengueros in the Dominican Republic. El Jeffrey first became a household name with the 80's merengue group La Artilleria along with Nelson Gil, Joan Minaya and "La Rubia" Jaqueline. With La Artilleria he recorded the major hits "Soy yo" and "Otra noche." His song "Palabritas" entered the Billboard Tropical Airplay chart at # 33 in 2006.

In 2019, he performed his first Christian song with Luigui López, with the musical production of Josué Guzmán. In an interview with Alofoke Radio Show, Santiago Matías asked him about the scar on his forehead, so he explained what happened, which, he says, was something supernatural. In 2021, he released "Que pena", with which he announced that he was preparing his musical album entitled "Mi Regreso".

Discography

 Por Qué Te Siento Aquí (1994)

 Potpurrí
 Mi Hijo
 En Tu Pelo
 Ven a Mi Mesa
 Niña
 Esta Locura
 Sin Ti
 Por Tu Boca
 Lágrimas de Sangre
 Dejar de Llorar

 Jeffrey para el Mundo (1998)

 Un Mal Necesario
 Mi Mundo Está Vacío
 Quieres Ser Mi Amante
 Estoy Muy Solo
 Y por Tanto
 Yo de Aquí No Me Voy
 No Lastimes Más
 Abrázame
 Mujer Infiel
 Me Muero por Eso

 Mi Tierra (2004)

 Mi Tierra
 Pobre Diablo
 Debo Hacerlo
 La Noche
 La Mamila
 Cuando Seas Mía
 Cuéntale a Él
 Ni el Odio Ni la Mentira
 Sé que Fallé
 Mala Pata
 Palabritas
 Se Me Va la Vida
 Quiéreme

 No Te Puedo Perdonar (2004)

 Luisa María
 Te Veo Venir Soledad
 No Te Puedo Perdonar
 Nunca Voy an Olvidarte
 Ajena
 Se Me Va la Vida
 No Dices Nada
 Usted Se Me Llevó la Vida
 Falso Amor
 Eso Eres Tú

 Mi Vida (2005)

 Mi Vida
 Cada Quien Su Camino
 O Me Quieres o Me Dejas
 Mi Quisqueya
 El Cigarillo
 Jeffrey Acabó Con To'
 Morir de Amor
 Ay la Gente
 Esta Es la Primera Vez
 Ni el Odio Ni la Mentira
 
 Sufriendo de a Duro
 La Mujer Que Nos Gusta (feat. Johnny Ventura)
 Tu Secreto (feat. Papi Sánchez)
 Romántico
 

 Yo Soy Merengue (2011)

 Dos Locos Amantes
 Excúseme el Pedido
 Pedazo de Cartón
 Insensible a Ti
 Mujeres
 Loco de Amor
 Por Amor
 Búscate un Hombre
 No Te Puedo Perdonar
 Niña Marisol
 Él No Te Ama
 Voy a Ser Grande
 Ayer y Hoy
 Por Amor (feat. Rafael Solano y Niní Cáffaro) (Balada)

References

External links
El Jeffrey on Myspace

20th-century Dominican Republic male singers
Bachata musicians
Merengue musicians
Latin music songwriters
1974 births
Living people
21st-century Dominican Republic male singers